Tolquhon Castle (pronounced: "toh-hon", and sometimes spelt 'Tolquhoun') is located in Aberdeenshire, north-east Scotland. The castle was built by William Forbes, 7th Laird of Tolquhon, between 1584 and 1589 as an extension to the earlier tower house known as Preston's Tower. Although ruined, the castle has been described as "the most characteristic château of the Scots Renaissance". It is in the care of Historic Scotland and is open to the public.

History
Preston's Tower was constructed in the early 15th century, either by Sir Henry Preston or by his son-in-law Sir William Forbes, who inherited part of the Preston lands in 1420, following Sir Henry's death. His descendant William Forbes, 7th Laird of Tolquhon (died 1596), began work on a new castle in 1584, retaining the Preston Tower but adding new, more comfortable accommodation. He also improved the gardens and parkland around the house. King James VI was entertained at Tolquhon in July 1589. The new buildings were arranged around a courtyard, and included an elaborate gatehouse, and a first-floor gallery. An inscription on the gatehouse records that "AL THIS WARKE EXCEP THE AULD TOWR WAS BEGUN BE WILLIAM FORBES 15 APRIL 1584 AND ENDIT BE HIM 20 OCTOBER 1589". The home of a "Renaissance man", Tolquhon was designed for show rather than defence, and was the work of the mason-architect Thomas Leper or Leiper. Leper's distinctive triple shot-holes flank the main entrance, and are also found at nearby Arnage Castle and Dean Castle in Ayrshire. Also unusual is the stone tilework in the main hall.

After William Forbes' death his descendants continued to occupy Tolquhon until 1718, when they were forced to move out due to debts incurred by the failure of the Darien scheme. The castle subsequently decayed and is now a ruin. It is in the guardianship of Historic Scotland and is open to the public. Tolquhon is also a scheduled monument.

Description
The main entrance is on the north range of the castle, with the Preston Tower forming the north-east corner. The gallery occupies the first floor of the west range, while the main hall is in the south range, accessed via a stair from the courtyard. A prison was located within the south-east tower. To the north of the main quadrangle is the walled outer courtyard, with the remains of a doocot.

References

External links

Historic Environment Scotland: Visitor guide
 Tolquhon Castle Virtual Tour

Houses completed in 1589
Castles in Aberdeenshire
Listed castles in Scotland
Listed houses in Scotland
Historic house museums in Aberdeenshire
Historic Scotland properties in Aberdeenshire
1580s establishments in Scotland
Scheduled Ancient Monuments in Aberdeenshire